Esther Sans Takeuchi (born Esther Sans) is a materials scientist and chemical engineer, working on energy storage systems and power sources for biomedical devices. She is also a Distinguished Professor at Stony Brook University and a chief scientist at Brookhaven National Laboratory. She holds more than 150 U.S. patents. “The battery was invented once and reinvented over 100 times. I don’t own the patent. The company does. It was called Greatbatch. Now it’s called Integer Corp. When you join a company, you sign over your patent rights to the company.”

Life and career 
Takeuchi is the daughter of Mary (Marija) and Rudolf Sans (Rūdolfs Sāns), Second World War refugees from Latvia. Rudolf and Mary fled Soviet-occupied Latvia for Germany in 1945, living in a refugee camp for several years, ultimately immigrating to the United States.

Takeuchi graduated from the University of Pennsylvania in 1975 having majored in Chemistry and History. She then worked on her Ph.D. in Organic Chemistry at the Ohio State University until 1981, under the direction of Dr. Harold Shechter. Her graduate research focused on the reactions of alkoxides with (chloromethyl)trisubstituted silanes.

While working on her Ph.D., she met Kenneth J. Takeuchi and the two married on May 15, 1982.

After completing post-doctoral training in electrochemistry at the University of North Carolina at Chapel Hill and the University of Buffalo, she worked at Greatbatch Inc. in Clarence, New York for 22 years. It was here, under the funding of Wilson Greatbatch, that Takeuchi continued development of the Li/SVO battery. She has also worked on batteries for neuro stimulators, drug delivery systems, pacemakers, and also industrial batteries for environments concerning high temperatures, vibrations, and need of reliability.

In 2007, she joined academia at the University of Buffalo as the Greatbatch Professor of Advanced Power Sources. She is currently a Distinguished Professor at Stony Brook University in the departments of Chemistry, and Material Science and Engineering. She was selected as the 2013 recipient of the E.V. Murphree Award in Industrial and Engineering Chemistry, sponsored by Exxon Mobil. Takeuchi is also a Fellow of The Electrochemical Society and served as the organization's president from 2011-2012.

Current/Recent 
On July 16, 2018, Takeuchi’s company has been awarded a $12 million grant from the Department of Energy. They aim and want to focus on the development of batteries that are high energy and high power, which has traditionally been complicated and unfeasible. These batteries could be used in electric vehicles or in combination with renewable solar energy systems and renewable energy farms.
The company also has several projects funded by the DOE and supported by Mercedes-Benz. One particular project is focused around increasing the energy content of the negative electrode within electric vehicles and a secondary project is centered around increase the energy content of the positive electrode. A third program is focused around enabling electric vehicles to charge faster. Together, they will be able to increase the range of current electric vehicles and make EVs a much more feasible and enticing option/competitor to traditional gasoline vehicles.

Vision 
Takeuchi visions to create an entity bringing together Stony Brook, Brookhaven National Lab, federal funding, state funding, industry, and philanthropy, creating an institute focused on energy and the environment.

Innovation 
Takeuchi has been primarily recognized and awarded for her innovation regarding implantable cardiac defibrillators. Millions of people around the world rely on these devices.  For these devices to be easily miniature and reliable, they needed to be connected to an energy source that was also characteristically similar. Takeuchi’s innovation allowed for such devices to effectively function. The innovation is a new type of battery technology regarding a new cathode material, highly conductive electrolyte, and a novel cell design enabling high power and resulting in the creation of a silver vanadium oxide battery. These batteries are highly powerful, miniature in size, and have a long life. All of these characteristics greatly benefit ICD’s and their ability to help people with irregular rhythms and beating frequencies within their hearts. Every year, there are more than 300,000 ICDs implanted, and every year, the silver vanadium oxide battery is the dominant battery used by these devices. These SVO batteries are able to last for around five years, compared to the life of around a year for the other forms of batteries. Being implanted into the body, the life of such an implant is crucial. If traditional forms of batteries are used, patients usually have to go through surgery every year to replace the devices and ensure the functionality of the implant. With the SVO batteries, the batteries last much longer, over five times, and therefore patients don’t have to have their devices replaced as frequently. Initially launched into the marketplace it the late 1980s and early 1990s, these SVO batteries are still prevalent and widely used today.

Awards 
 European Inventor Award in the "non-EPO countries" category, presented by the European Patent Office (EPO), 2018
E.V. Murphree Award in Industrial & Engineering Chemistry, American Chemical Society, 2013
 Elected, National Academy of Engineering, 2004
 Fellow, American Institute for Medical and Biological Engineering, 1999
 National Medal of Technology and Innovation, 2008 - for inventing the silver vanadium oxide battery that powers implantable cardiac defibrillators
 Inductee, National Inventors Hall of Fame, 2011
Fellow, American Academy of Arts and Sciences, 2021
NAS Award in Chemical Sciences (2022)

Books 

 Vanadium: Chemistry, Biochemistry, Pharmacology and Practical Applications / Edition 1, by Alan S. Tracey, Gail R. Willsky, Esther S. Takeuchi

References

Further reading 
 "Inventor Portrait: Esther Takeuchi", Ironic Sans, Feb. 7, 2013

External links 
 Esther Takeuchi faculty website
 Stony Brook University professor and Brookhaven Lab scientist honored for leading advances in energy storage technology

Living people
University of Pennsylvania alumni
Ohio State University Graduate School alumni
American chemical engineers
Battery inventors
1953 births
American inventors
Latvian inventors
Women inventors
American people of Latvian descent
Fellows of the American Institute for Medical and Biological Engineering
Members of the United States National Academy of Engineering
National Medal of Technology recipients
University at Buffalo faculty
Fellows of the American Academy of Arts and Sciences
Presidents of the Electrochemical Society